No U-Turn Syndrome (NUTS) is a term first coined by Singaporean entrepreneur Sim Wong Hoo to prominently describe the social behaviour of Singaporeans having a mindset of compliance to higher authorities before proceeding with any action. He makes a comparison of traffic rules in Singapore to those found overseas, to describe the phenomenon. In Singapore, drivers are not allowed to make a U-turn unless a sign specifically allows them to do so, while in some other countries drivers may make U-turns freely so long as a "No U-turn" sign is not present. Following that, this analogy is used to explain the red tape he has encountered with hard-nosed bureaucrats, which in turn stifles the very creativity that the Singaporean government has been trying to promote in the recent years.

NUTS is also considered one of the major criticisms of the rigid Singapore education system, where students are taught from a young age to obey instructions in an unquestioning manner, in a society where grades and paper certification are emphasised at the expense of some life skills.

In 2003, the term was referred to by Singaporean MPs during discussions about encouraging entrepreneurship. Five MPs said that "the biggest hurdle for Singaporeans in creating a pro-enterprise environment is the NUTS mentality."

References

Singaporean culture
Education in Singapore